Hamnet Shakespeare (1585–1596) was the only son of English playwright William Shakespeare.

Hamnet may also refer to:

Hamnet (novel), a 2020 novel by Maggie O'Farrell
Hamnet Holditch (1800–1867), English mathematician
Variant spelling of Hamnett, a surname

See also

The Hamnet Players, a virtual theatre company